Joseph-Napoléon Bonaparte (born Giuseppe di Buonaparte, ; ; ; 7 January 176828 July 1844) was a French statesman, lawyer, diplomat and older brother of Napoleon Bonaparte. During the Napoleonic Wars, the latter made him King of Naples (1806–1808), and then King of Spain (1808–1813). After the fall of Napoleon, Joseph styled himself Comte de Survilliers and emigrated to the United States, where he settled near Bordentown, New Jersey, on an estate overlooking the Delaware River not far from Philadelphia.

Early years and personal life

Joseph was born in 1768 to Carlo Buonaparte and Maria Letizia Ramolino at Corte, the capital of the Corsican Republic. In the year of his birth, Corsica was invaded by France and conquered the following year. His father was originally a follower of the Corsican patriot leader Pasquale Paoli, but later became a supporter of French rule.

Bonaparte trained as a lawyer. In that role and as a politician and diplomat, he served in the Cinq-Cents and as the French ambassador to Rome. On 30 September 1800, as Minister Plenipotentiary, he signed a treaty of friendship and commerce between France and the United States at Morfontaine, alongside Charles Pierre Claret de Fleurieu, and Pierre Louis Roederer.

In 1795 Bonaparte was a member of the Council of Ancients. Four years later, he used this position to help his brother Napoleon to overthrow the Directory.

The Château de Villandry had been seized by the French Revolutionary government. In the early 19th century, his brother as Emperor Napoleon acquired the château for him.

King of Naples

Upon the outbreak of war between France and Austria in 1805, Ferdinand IV of Naples had agreed to a treaty of neutrality with Napoleon but, a few days later, declared his support for Austria. He permitted a large Anglo-Russian force to land in his kingdom. Napoleon, however, was soon victorious. After the War of the Third Coalition was shattered on 5 December at the Battle of Austerlitz, Ferdinand was subject to Napoleon's wrath.

On 27 December 1805, Napoleon issued a proclamation from the Schönbrunn declaring Ferdinand to have forfeited his kingdom. He said that a French invasion would soon follow to ensure 'that the finest of countries is relieved from the yoke of the most faithless of men.'

On 31 December Napoleon commanded Joseph Bonaparte to move to Rome, where he would be assigned to command the army sent to dispossess Ferdinand of his throne. Although Bonaparte was the nominal commander-in-chief of the expedition, Marshal Masséna was in effective command of operations, with General St. Cyr second. But, St. Cyr, who had previously held the senior command of French troops in the region, soon resigned in protest at being made subordinate to Masséna and left for Paris. An outraged Napoleon ordered St. Cyr to return to his post at once.

On 8 February 1806 the French invasion force of forty-thousand men crossed into Naples. The centre and right of the army under Masséna and General Reynier advanced south from Rome, while Giuseppe Lechi led a force down the Adriatic coast from Ancona. On his brother's recommendation, Bonaparte attached himself to Reynier. The French advance faced little resistance. Even before any French troops had crossed the border, the Anglo-Russian forces had beaten a prudent retreat, the British withdrawing to Sicily, and the Russians to Corfu. Abandoned by his allies, King Ferdinand had also already set sail for Palermo on 23 January. Queen Maria-Carolina lingered a little longer in the capital but, on 11 February, fled to join her husband.

The first obstacle the French encountered was the fortress of Gaeta; its governor, Prince Louis of Hesse-Philippsthal, refused to surrender his charge. There was no meaningful delay of the invaders, as Masséna detached a small force to besiege the garrison before continuing south. Capua opened its gates after only token resistance. On 14 February Masséna took possession of Naples and, the following day, Bonaparte staged a triumphant entrance into the city. Reynier was quickly dispatched to seize control of the Strait of Messina and, on 9 March, inflicted a crushing defeat of the Neapolitan Royal Army at the Battle of Campo Tenese, effectively destroying it as a fighting force and securing the entire mainland for the French.

On 30 March 1806 Napoleon issued a decree installing Joseph Bonaparte as King of Naples and Sicily; the decree said as follows:

"Napoleon, by the Grace of God and the constitutions. Emperor of the French and King of Italy, to all those to whom these presents come, greetings. The interests of our people, the honour of our Crown, and the tranquillity of the Continent of Europe requiring that we should assure, in a stable and definite manner, the lot of the people of Naples and of Sicily, who have fallen into our power by the right of conquest, and who constitute a part of the Grand Empire, we declare that we recognise, as King of Naples and of Sicily, our well-beloved brother, Joseph Napoleon, Grand Elector of France. This Crown will be hereditary, by order of primogeniture, in his descendants male, legitimate, and natural, etc."

Joseph's arrival in Naples was warmly greeted with cheers and he was eager to be a monarch well liked by his subjects. Seeking to win the favour of the local elites, he maintained in their posts the vast majority of those who had held office and position under the Bourbons and was anxious to not in any way appear a foreign oppressor. With a provisional government set up in the capital, Joseph then immediately set off, accompanied by General Lamarque, on a tour of his new realm. The principal object of the tour was to assess the feasibility of an immediate invasion of Sicily and the expulsion of Ferdinand and Maria-Carolina from their refuge in Palermo. But, upon reviewing the situation at the Strait of Messina, Joseph was forced to admit the impossibility of such an enterprise, the Bourbons having carried off all boats and transports from along the coast and concentrated their remaining forces, alongside the British, on the opposite side. Unable to possess himself of Sicily, Joseph was nevertheless master of the mainland and he continued his progress through Calabria and on to Lucania and Apulia, visiting the main villages and meeting the local notables, clergy and people, allowing his people to grow accustomed to their new king and enabling himself to form first-hand a picture of the condition of his kingdom.

Upon returning to Naples, Bonaparte received a deputation from the French Senate congratulating him upon his accession. The King formed a ministry staffed by many competent and talented men; he was determined to follow a reforming agenda and bring Naples the benefits of the French Revolution, without its excesses. Saliceti was appointed Minister of Police, Roederer Minister of Finance, Miot Minister of the Interior and General Dumas Minister of War. Marshal Jourdan was also confirmed as Governor of Naples, an appointment made by Napoleon, and served as Bonaparte's foremost military adviser.

Bonaparte embarked on an ambitious programme of reform and regeneration, in order to raise Naples to the level of a modern state in the mould of Napoleonic France. Monastic orders were suppressed, their property nationalised, and their funds confiscated to steady the royal finances. Feudal privileges and taxes were abolished; however, the nobility was compensated by an indemnity in the form of a certificate that could be exchanged in return for lands nationalised from the Church. Provincial intendants were instructed to engage those dispossessed former monks who were willing to work in public education, and to ensure that elderly monks no longer able to support themselves could move into communal establishments founded for their care. A college for the education of young girls was established in each province. A central college was founded at Aversa for the daughters of public functionaries, and the ablest from the provincial schools, to be admitted under the personal patronage of Queen Julie.

The practice of forcibly recruiting prisoners into the army was abolished. To suppress and control robbers in the mountains, military commissions were established with the power to judge and execute, without appeal, all those brigands arrested with arms in their possession. Public works programmes were begun to provide employment to the poor and invest in improvements to the kingdom. Highways were built to Reggio. The project of a Calabrian road was completed under Bonaparte within the year after decades of delay. In the second year of his reign, Bonaparte installed the first system of public street-lighting in Naples, modelled on that operating in Paris.

Although the kingdom was not at that time furnished with a constitution, and thus Joseph's will as monarch reigned supreme, there is yet no instance of him ever adopting a measure of policy without prior discussion of the matter in the Council of State and the passing of a majority vote in favour his course of action by the counsellors. Joseph thus presided over Naples in the best traditions of Enlightened absolutism, doubling the revenue of the crown from seven to fourteen million ducats in his brief two-year reign while all the time seeking to lighten the burdens of his people rather than increase them.

Joseph ruled Naples for two years before being replaced by his sister's husband, Joachim Murat. Joseph was then made King of Spain in August 1808, soon after the French invasion.

King of Spain

Joseph somewhat reluctantly left Naples, where he was popular, and arrived in Spain, where he was extremely unpopular. Joseph came under heavy fire from his opponents in Spain, who tried to smear his reputation by calling him Pepe Botella (Joe Bottle) for his alleged heavy drinking, an accusation echoed by later Spanish historiography, despite the fact that Joseph was abstemious. His arrival sparked a massive Spanish revolt against French rule, and the beginning of the Peninsular War. Thompson says the Spanish revolt was, "a reaction against new institutions and ideas, a movement for loyalty to the old order: to the hereditary crown of the Most Catholic kings, which Napoleon, an excommunicated enemy of the Pope, had put on the head of a Frenchman; to the Catholic Church persecuted by republicans who had desecrated churches, murdered priests, and enforced a "loi des cultes" (law of religion); and to local and provincial rights and privileges threatened by an efficiently centralized government.

Joseph temporarily retreated with much of the French Army to northern Spain. Feeling himself in an ignominious position, Joseph then proposed his own abdication from the Spanish throne, hoping that Napoleon would sanction his return to the Neapolitan Throne he had formerly occupied. Napoleon dismissed Joseph's misgivings out of hand, and to back up the raw and ill-trained levies he had initially allocated to Spain, the Emperor sent heavy French reinforcements to assist Joseph in maintaining his position as King of Spain. Despite the easy recapture of Madrid, and nominal control by Joseph's government over many cities and provinces, Joseph's reign over Spain was always tenuous at best, and constantly resisted by pro-Bourbon guerrillas. Joseph and his supporters never established complete control over the country, and would eventually abdicate the throne.

King Joseph's Spanish supporters were called josefinos or afrancesados (frenchified). During his reign, he ended the Spanish Inquisition, partly because Napoleon was at odds with Pope Pius VII at the time. Despite such efforts to win popularity, Joseph's foreign birth and support, plus his membership of a Masonic lodge, virtually guaranteed he would never be accepted as legitimate by the bulk of the Spanish people. During Joseph's rule of Spain, Venezuela declared independence from Spain. The king had virtually no influence over the course of the ongoing Peninsular War: Joseph's nominal command of French forces in Spain was mostly illusory, as the French commanders theoretically subordinate to King Joseph insisted on checking with Napoleon before carrying out Joseph's instructions.

King Joseph abdicated the Spanish throne and returned to France after the main French forces were defeated by a British-led coalition at the Battle of Vitoria in 1813. During the closing campaign of the War of the Sixth Coalition Napoleon left his brother to govern Paris with the title Lieutenant General of the Empire. As a result, he was again in nominal command of the French Army that was defeated at the Battle of Paris.

He was seen by some Bonapartists as the rightful Emperor of the French after the death of Napoleon's own son Napoleon II in 1832, although he did little to advance his claim.

Later life in the United States and Europe

Bonaparte came to America onboard the Commerce under the name of M. Bouchard. British naval officers had searched the vessel three times but never found Bonaparte on board and the ship arrived on 15 July 1815. In the period 1817–1832, Bonaparte lived primarily in the United States (where he sold the jewels he had taken from Spain). He first settled in New York City and Philadelphia, where his house became the centre of activity for French expatriates. In 1823, he was elected as a member to the American Philosophical Society. Later he purchased an estate, called Point Breeze and formerly owned by Stephen Sayre. It was in Bordentown, New Jersey, on the east side of the Delaware River. It was located near the confluence of Crosswicks Creek and the Delaware. He considerably expanded Sayre's home and created extensive gardens in the picturesque style. When his first home was destroyed by fire in January 1820 he converted his stables into a second grand house. On completion, it was generally viewed - perhaps diplomatically - as the "second-finest house in America" after the White House. At Point Breeze, Bonaparte entertained many of the leading intellectuals and politicians of his day.

In the summer of 1825, the Quaker scientist Reuben Haines III described Bonaparte's estate at Point Breeze, in a letter to his cousin:
"I partook of royal fare on solid silver and attended by six waiters who supplied me with 9 courses of the most delicious viands, many of which I could not possibly tell what they were composed of; spending the intermediate time in Charles' private rooms looking over the Herbarium and Portfolios of the Princess, or riding with her and the Prince drawn by two Elegant Horses along the ever varying roads of the park amidst splendid Rhododendrons on the margin of the artificial lake on whose smooth surface gently glided the majestic European swans. Stopping to visit the Aviary enlivened by the most beautiful English pheasants, passing by alcoves ornamented with statues and busts of Parian marble, our course enlivened by the footsteps of the tame deer and the flight of the Woodcock, and when alighting stopping to admire the graceful form of two splendid Etruscan vases of Porphyry 3 ft. high & 2 in diameter presented by the Queen of Sweden [Joseph's sister-in-law Desiree Clary Bernadotte] or ranging [?] through the different appartments of the mansion through a suite of rooms 15 ft. in [height] decorated with the finest productions of the pencils of Coregeo [sic]! Titian! Rubens! Vandyke! Vernet! Tenniers [sic] and Paul Potter and a library of the most splended books I ever beheld."Wyck Association Collection (Mss.Ms.Coll.52). American Philosophical Society Library. Philadelphia, Pennsylvania. https://search.amphilsoc.org/collections/view?docId=ead/Mss.Ms.Coll.52-ead.xml;query=Wyck;brand=default#top

Reputedly some Mexican revolutionaries offered to crown Bonaparte as Emperor of Mexico in 1820, but he declined. Mexico gained its independence from Spain in 1821.

In 1832, Bonaparte moved to London, returning to his estate in the United States only intermittently. In 1844, he died in Florence, Italy. His body was returned to France and buried in Les Invalides, in Paris.

Family
Bonaparte married Marie Julie Clary, daughter of François Clary and his wife, on 1 August 1794 in Cuges-les-Pins, France. They had three daughters:
 Julie Joséphine Bonaparte (29 February 1796 – 6 June 1797).
 Zénaïde Laetitia Julie Bonaparte (8 July 1801 – 1854); married in 1822 to Charles Lucien Bonaparte.
 Charlotte Napoléone Bonaparte (31 October 1802 – 2 March 1839); married in 1826 to Napoleon Louis Bonaparte.
He identified the two surviving daughters as his heirs.

He also fathered two children with Maria Giulia Colonna, the Countess of Atri:
 Giulio (1806–1838).
 Teresa (1808–died in infancy).

Bonaparte had two American daughters born at Point Breeze, his estate in Bordentown, New Jersey, by his mistress, Annette Savage ("Madame de la Folie"):
 Pauline Anne; died young.
 Catherine Charlotte (1822–1890); married Col. Zebulon Howell Benton of Jefferson County, New York, and had four daughters and three sons. Son Louis Joseph Benton (1848–1940) had one son, Frederick Joseph Benton (1901–1967).

Freemasonry
Joseph Bonaparte was admitted to Marseille's lodge la Parfaite Sincérité in 1793. He was asked by his brother Napoleon to monitor freemasonry as Grand Master of the Grand Orient of France (1804–1815). He founded the Grand Lodge National of Spain (1809). With Cambacérès, he encouraged the post-Revolution rebirth of the Freemasonry Order in France.

Legacy
 Joseph Bonaparte Gulf in the Northern Territory of Australia is named after him.
 Lake Bonaparte, located in the town of Diana, New York, United States, is also named after him.

Representation in other media
 A main character in the play Golden Boy (1937), by Clifford Odets, is named Joe Bonaparte.
 The romantic web among Joseph Bonaparte, Napoleon, Jean-Baptiste Bernadotte, Julie Clary and Désirée Clary was the subject of the novel Désirée (1951), by Annemarie Selinko.
 The novel was adapted as a film of the same name, Désirée (1954), with Marlon Brando as Napoleon, Jean Simmons as Désirée, and Cameron Mitchell as Joseph Bonaparte.
 In Thomas B. Costain's historical novel The Tontine, (1955), he describes a visit by one of his protagonists to Joseph Bonaparte's estate Point Breeze in Bordentown, New Jersey. The character was involved there in some minor Napoleonic intrigue.

See also
 Bayonne Statute

References

Further reading
 Connelly, Owen S. Jr. "Joseph Bonaparte as King of Spain" History Today (Feb 1962), Vol. 12 Issue 2, pp. 86–96.
 
  biography: book received the New Jersey Council for the Humanities first place book award in 2006.

External links

 Joseph Bonaparte at Point Breeze
 Joseph Bonaparte and the Jersey Devil
 Antiguo Régimen: José I Bonaparte 
 
 Spencer Napoleonica Collection  at Newberry Library

1768 births
1844 deaths
19th-century Spanish monarchs
19th-century monarchs of Naples
19th century in Spain
People from Bordentown, New Jersey
People from Corte, Haute-Corse
Joseph
French people of Italian descent
Knights of Santiago
Knights of the Golden Fleece of Spain
Members of the Council of Five Hundred
Members of the Sénat conservateur
Members of the Chamber of Peers of the Hundred Days
French Roman Catholics
Grand Croix of the Légion d'honneur
Joseph Bonaparte
Grand Crosses of the Royal Order of Spain
Joseph Bonaparte
People of the Peninsular War
French Freemasons
Bonapartist pretenders to the French throne
People of the Kingdom of Naples (Napoleonic)